Thunderbitch is the self-titled debut recording by Thunderbitch, a band founded by singer and guitarist Brittany Howard.

Composition
The songs on Thunderbitch hop into garage punk, "pure", "glammy" punk rock, and "wild and trashy" rock and roll, with roots rock and talking blues. It also dons a "raucously" lo-fi sound.

Critical reception

Thunderbitch was released to general positivity from music critics. On Metacritic, it holds a score of 80 out of 100, indicating "generally positive reviews", based on nine reviews.

Hilary Saunders for Paste called it "consciously straightforward and unapologetically so" and the band as "the ideal side project - low-pressure and made purely for fun."

Accolades

Year-end lists

References

2015 debut albums
ATO Records albums
Rock albums by American artists